Robbie or Robby is a surname. It is usually encountered as a nickname or a shortened form of Robert, Rob or Robin. The name experienced a significant rise in popularity in Northern Ireland in 2003.

People

Given name

Robbie
Robbie Amell (born 1988), Canadian-American actor
Robbie Burns (1759–1796), Scottish poet
Robbie Coltrane (1950–2022) Scottish actor
Robbie Daymond (born 1982) American actor and voice actor
Robbie E (born 1983), pro wrestler
Robbie Earle (born 1965), Jamaican footballer and broadcaster
Robbie Erlin (born 1990), American baseball player
Robbie Farah (born 1984), Australian rugby league player
Robbie Fowler (born 1975), English footballer and manager
Robbie Ftorek (born 1952), National Hockey League player and coach
Robbie Grey (born 1957), English lead singer of Modern English
Robbie Grossman (born 1989), American baseball player
Robbie Hart (born 1947), English football referee
Robbie Hunter-Paul (born 1976), New Zealand rugby league player
Robbie Keane (born 1980), Irish footballer
Robbie Klay (born 1986), South African singer and actor
Robbie Kruse (born 1988), Australian association football player
Robbie Knievel (born 1962), motorcycle daredevil
Robbie Maddison (born 1981), Australian motorcycle stunt rider
Robbie Nevil (born 1958), American singer
Robbie Perkins (born 1994), Australian professional baseball player
Robbie Pierce (1959-2023), American off road racer and businessman
Robbie Ray (born 1991), MLB American baseball player
Robbie Ray (born 1982), American auto racing driver
Robbie Rist (born 1964), American actor and musician
Robbie Robertson (born 1942), Canadian musician
Robbie Rogers (born 1987), American footballer, first openly gay professional athlete in North America
Robbie Savage (born 1974), soccer player
Robbie Sherman (born 1968), American songwriter and businessman
Robbie Widlansky (born 1984), American baseball player
Robbie Williams (born 1974), English singer-songwriter
Dove-Myer Robinson (1901–1989), former mayor of Auckland, New Zealand, known as Robbie

Robby
Robby Albarado, (born 1973), horse racing jockey
Robby Benson, stage name of American actor Robin David Segal (born 1956)
Robby Brink (born 1971), South African former rugby union player
Robby Ginepri (born 1982), tennis player
Robby Gordon (born 1969), race car driver
Robby Krieger (born 1946), American guitar player of The Doors
Robby Langers (born 1960), retired footballer from Luxembourg
Robby Lyons (born 1989), race car driver
Robby Müller (born 1940), Dutch cinematographer most often associated with film director Wim Wenders
Robby Steinhardt (1950–2021), American rock violinist and singer best known for his work with the group Kansas
Robby Thompson (born 1962), Major League Baseball player

Surname
David Robbie (Australian footballer) (born 1944), Australian rules footballer
David Robbie (Fijian politician) (1849–1940), businessman and politician in colonial Fiji
David Robbie (Scottish footballer) (1899–1978)
Joe Robbie (1916–1990), former owner of the Miami Dolphins National Football League team
Margot Robbie (born 1990), Australian actress and film producer
Mike Robbie (born 1943), former general manager of the Miami Dolphins football team, son of Joe Robbie
Rod Robbie (1928–2012), British-born Canadian architect and planner
Seymour Robbie (1919–2004), American TV director
William Robbie (1849–1929), stonemason and mayor of Chico, California (1907–1919)

Fictional characters
"Robbie", a story in Isaac Asimov's I, Robot
Robby Keene, a character in the Cobra Kai series
Robbie (TV series), 2020 American comedy television series
Robby the Robot, in films and TV programs
Robbie the Reindeer, in three animated comedy TV specials
Robbie Douglas, in the TV series My Three Sons
Robbie Hart, lead character in the 1998 film The Wedding Singer
Robbie McGrath, in the TV series Radio Free Roscoe
Robbie Quinn, in the TV series Fair City
Robbie Robertson (comics), in the Spider-Man comic books
Robbie Rotten, in the Icelandic children's TV show LazyTown
Robbie Shapiro, in the TV series Victorious
Robbie Sinclair, on the TV series Dinosaurs
Robby Stewart, in the TV series Hannah Montana
Robbie Valentino, in the animated series Gravity Falls
Robbie White, a hunter in the video game Identity V
The title character of Robby the Rascal, an anime TV series
Robby, a seal that appears in the TV series Pingu
Roberta 'Robbie' Henderson, in The Ferals, an Australian children's TV series
The title character of Robby (film), a 1968 retelling of Robinson Crusoe
The title character of Robbie (film), a 1979 British public information film
Robbie Turner, from Atonement (film) (2007)
Robbie, from Angus, Thongs, and Perfect Snogging (2008)

See also
Robi (disambiguation)

References 

English masculine given names
Masculine given names
Hypocorisms